Rugby station or Rugby railway station may refer to:
 Rugby railway station, a railway station in Rugby, Warwickshire, England
 Rugby Central railway station, a former railway station in Rugby, Warwickshire
 Rugby Parkway railway station, a proposed new station to be built on the edge of Rugby, Warwickshire
 Rugby Radio Station, a radio transmission station in Hillmorton, Warwickshire
 Rugby Road Halt, a former railway halt in London, England.
 Rugby station (North Dakota), an Amtrak station in Rugby, North Dakota, USA

See also
Rugby (disambiguation)